Cash McCall (born Morris Dollison Jr.; January 28, 1941 – April 20, 2019) was an American electric blues guitarist, singer and songwriter. He was best known for his 1966 R&B hit "When You Wake Up". Over his long career, his musical style evolved from gospel music to soul music to the blues.

Biography
McCall was born in New Madrid, Missouri. He joined the United States Army and then settled in Chicago, where he had lived for a period as a child. In 1964, he played guitar and sang, alongside Otis Clay, with the Gospel Songbirds, who recorded for Excello Records. Cash later joined another gospel singing ensemble, the Pilgrim Jubilee Singers.

Billed under his birth name, his debut solo single release was "Earth Worm" (1963). Three years later he co-wrote "When You Wake Up" with the record producer Monk Higgins. His initial soul-styled demo was issued by Thomas Records, which billed him as Cash McCall. ("Cash McCall" had been a 1955 novel by Cameron Hawley which spawned a 1960 movie starring James Garner as Cash McCall, released six years before the record company changed Dollison's name). The song reached number 19 on the US Billboard R&B chart.  This led to McCall touring with Lou Christie and Mitch Ryder in Dick Clark's Caravan of Stars. However, subsequent releases for both Thomas and Checker Records failed to chart. These included the song "It's Wonderful to Be in Love". In 1967, McCall co-wrote "That's How It Is (When You're in Love)", a Top 30 R&B hit for Otis Clay.

Under the tutelage of Willie Dixon, McCall went on to become a session musician and songwriter for Chess Records. In the late 1960s, McCall, along with Jimmy Dawkins and Johnny Twist, played guitar on some early recordings by George "Wild Child" Butler.

McCall gravitated towards the blues in the 1970s. He recorded the album Omega Man (1973) before relocating to Los Angeles in 1976. He recorded the album No More Doggin''', released in 1983. In 1985, McCall and his band appeared at the Long Beach Blues Festival. In 1987, Stony Plain Records released the album Cash Up Front. The collection included accompaniment by such notables such Nathan East and Welton Gite (bass); Chuck Findley (flugelhorn, trumpet); Les McCann and Richard Tee (piano); Phil Upchurch (rhythm guitar); and Hank Cicalo (sound engineer) and Bernie Grundman (mastering).

McCall co-produced Willie Dixon's Grammy Award–winning Hidden Charms (1988) and played in Dixon's All-Stars band. Since then he has toured as a solo artist and appeared with the Chicago Rhythm and Blues Kings, for which he has written several songs. He has also provided backing to the singer known as Big Twist and performed in the Chicago Blues Review. McCall's songs have been recorded by the Blind Boys of Alabama, the Mighty Reapers, Margie Evans, Tyrone Davis and Mitty Collier.

In 2018, McCall and longtime friend and fellow Chicago musician Benny Turner reunited in the studio to record Going Back Home.  It was released in January 2019.  Just months later, on April 20, 2019, McCall died from lung cancer.

 Awards and accolades 
17th Independent Music Awards – Nominee for Blues Album – Going Back Home2019 Blues Blast Music Awards – Nominee for Traditional Blues Album – Going Back Home2019 Independent Blues Awards – Nominee for Best Traditional Blues CD – Going Back Home18th Independent Music Awards – Nominee for Blues Song – One Who's Got A LotDiscography
Singles

Albums
{| class="wikitable sortable"
|-
!Album title
!Record label
!Year of release
|-
|Omega Man|Paula Records
|1973
|-
|No More Doggin|L & R Records
|1983
|-
|Cash Up Front
|Stony Plain Records
|1987
|-
|Going Back Home (with Benny Turner)
(Includes Cash's original song "Money")
|Nola Blue Records
|2019
|}

Compilation albums

As sidemanWith Dorothy AshbyThe Rubaiyat of Dorothy Ashby (Cadet, 1970)With Howlin' WolfMessage to the Young (Chess, 1971) – producer, arranger and conductorWith Jack McDuffGin and Orange (Cadet, 1969)With Phil Upchurch'The Way I Feel'' (Cadet, 1970)

See also
List of electric blues musicians

References

1941 births
2019 deaths
People from New Madrid, Missouri
American blues singers
American blues guitarists
American male guitarists
American male singers
Songwriters from Missouri
Electric blues musicians
Singers from Chicago
Singers from Missouri
Songwriters from Illinois
Guitarists from Chicago
Guitarists from Missouri
20th-century American guitarists
20th-century American male musicians
American male songwriters